Tomáš Koubek (born 26 August 1992) is a Czech professional footballer who plays as a goalkeeper for Bundesliga club FC Augsburg and the Czech Republic national team.

Club career
Koubek made his league debut for Hradec Králové in a 2–1 win against Mladá Boleslav on 30 April 2011.

In October 2016, his club ordered him to train with their women's team for stating "women belong at the stove" in reaction to a decision against him by a female assistant referee, Lucie Ratajova.

On August 6, 2019, FC Augsburg announced the transfer of Koubek from Rennes for an undisclosed transfer fee. He also signed a four-year contract with the club.

International career
In October 2015, Koubek was called up to the Czech Republic squad for a UEFA Euro 2016 qualifier against the Netherlands. He was included in the Czech Republic squad that competed at the 2016 UEFA European Championship.

Honours
Stade Rennais
Coupe de France: 2018–19
Czech Republic
China Cup bronze: 2018
Czech Republic U19 
UEFA European Under-19 Championship runner-up: 2011

References

External links
 
 
 
 
 
 

Living people
1992 births
Sportspeople from Hradec Králové
Czech footballers
Czech Republic youth international footballers
Czech Republic under-21 international footballers
Czech Republic international footballers
Association football goalkeepers
FC Hradec Králové players
AC Sparta Prague players
FC Slovan Liberec players
Stade Rennais F.C. players
FC Augsburg players
Czech First League players
Czech National Football League players
Ligue 1 players
Bundesliga players
UEFA Euro 2016 players
UEFA Euro 2020 players
Czech expatriate footballers
Expatriate footballers in France
Czech expatriate sportspeople in France
Expatriate footballers in Germany
Czech expatriate sportspeople in Germany